The Cypress Mug is the name of the turned, polished mahogany mug that was awarded to the winner of the annual football game between the Louisiana Ragin' Cajuns (formerly the Southwestern Louisiana Bulldogs) and the Southeastern Louisiana Lions. The two teams have met 40 times on the football field, with the Ragin' Cajuns currently holding a 21–17–3 edge in the all time series. The rivalry had been inactive since the Ragin' Cajuns' move from the NCAA's Division I-AA to Division I-A; however the two teams played each other in 2017 in Lafayette for the first time since 1981, resulting in a 51–48 Cajuns victory and played again for the Ragin' Cajuns' home opener in 2022.

Game results

See also  
 List of NCAA college football rivalry games

References

College football rivalry trophies in the United States
Louisiana Ragin' Cajuns football
Southeastern Louisiana Lions football